Claus Killing-Günkel (born Günkel; 9 October 1963), in Esperanto also known as Nikolao Günkel, is a German teacher and interlinguist.

Life 
Claus J. Killing-Günkel was born Claus J. Günkel in Eschweiler, a city in western Rhineland, where he grew up, attended Städtisches Gymnasium Eschweiler and lived from 1963 to 1989 and from 1999 to 2009. From 1982 to 1992, he studied mathematics, computer science and French at the RWTH Aachen University and the University of Paderborn. At the latter, in 1993 and 1994, he was a lecturer in the Department of Education. Since 1997 he works as a berufskolleg teacher.

He is also a city guide and until 2012 he was a member of the board of Eschweiler Geschichtsverein (EGV) (i.e. Eschweiler Historical Society) and of the Fördererverein Nothberger Burg (i.e. Nothberg Castle Sponsors' Society). He has two children and currently lives in Cologne; since 2010 he is called Killing-Günkel.

Activity related to Esperanto 

In 1981, Killing-Günkel learned the constructed language Esperanto. In the Esperanto movement, he has managed publications, organized international meetings, founded an Esperanto youth group in Eschweiler and taught that language inter alia at the adult high school of Düren.

He is an Esperantologist, member of Gesellschaft für Interlinguistik (GIL) (Society for Interlinguistics) and of the scientists' staff of Akademio Internacia de la Sciencoj San Marino (AIS) as well as lector for mathematics of the international Scienca Revuo. In the 1980s and 1990s, he wrote articles for Kontakto, Monato and La Gazeto.

His field of activity within Esperanto Studies includes lexicography, etymology, Esperanto offshoots (called Esperantidos) and language propaedeutics within the scope of cybernetic pedagogy. First classifications of Esperantidos are made by him. Furthermore, he deals with Volapük, Interlingue, Interlingua, Glosa and Ido and edited an Esperantido magazine called Nova Provo (i.e. New Attempt) in the 1990s. He has contributed to various reference books and tools of Esperanto, including the Plena Ilustrita Vortaro de Esperanto of 2002.

See also 
List of contributors to PIV Killing-Günkel was responsible for technical terms for geodesy, topography, cuisine and science as well as for colloquial and taboo words.

Fonts 
Esperantological publications
 Gunkela Vortaro. 1991. 4th edition 2002. Esperanto neologism dictionnary with 1,764 headwords. Self-publishing.
 Vortaro Volapuko-Esperanto Esperanto-Volapuko kun etimologiaj rimarkoj (i.e. Dictionnary Volapük-Esperanto Esperanto-Volapük with etymologic remarks). 1996.
 NOVO, Nova Provo: 7 jaroj kaj 11 numeroj – provo bilanci sen saldi. In: De A al B. Festlibro por André Albault (i.e. Festschrift in honor of André Albault). 2002, .

 Publications on linguistic cybernetics
 Zur optimalen Dauer des Sprachorientierungsunterrichts (SpOU). In: Grundlagenstudien aus Kybernetik und Geisteswissenschaft. Tome 35, booklet 2, 1994. 
 with Huang Yani: Transferefiko de ILo sur la anglan depende de la gepatra lingvo – konkrete okaze de la china, germana kaj franca (i.e. Transfer efficance from Esperanto to English depending from the mother tongue — concrete in the cases of Chinese, German and French). In: Grundlagenstudien aus Kybernetik und Geisteswissenschaft. Tome 41, booklet 3, 2000. 

Poetry and fiction
 Poemete poeteme. 2nd edition. 1989. (In 2004, one of his poems was set to music by Jak LePuil on his CD Mi estas (i.e. I am).)
 amatory poems and funny stories in the Esperanto humor magazine La KancerKliniko
 Science-fiction short stories Letero el la jaro 2612 and Kredo. In: Sferoj – Sciencfikcio kaj Fantasto. Tome 8, 1993. ; Ondoj. In: Sferoj – Sciencfikcio kaj Fantasto. Tome 10, 2000. .

Lectures (excerpt)
Berlin, 1994: Rechnerinterlinguistik und die Axiomatisierung der Esperantogrammatik (i.e. computer interlinguistics and the axiomatization of Esperanto grammar)
Berlin, 1995: Übersetzungsprobleme und Entscheidungsmechanismen bei der Revision kulinarischer Begriffe eines Esperantowörterbuchs (i.e. translation problems and decision-making mechanisms in the revision of culinary terms of an Esperanto dictionary)
Berlin, 1996: Der aktuelle Stand von Esperantiden - Vorstellung und Schlussbemerkung (i.e. the current status of Esperantidos - introduction and conclusion)
Berlin, 1998: Ein Schülerwörterbuch Esperanto-Deutsch / Deutsch-Esperanto in Verbindung mit einer Esperanto-AG an einem Gymnasium (i.e. s student dictionary Esperanto-German / German-Esperanto in conjunction with an Esperanto workshop at a high school)
Motovun 2000: Reformprojektoj kaj proponoj pri nova alfabeto (i.e. reform projects and proposals for a new alphabet)
Berlin, 2000: Strukturvergleich von Esperantiden – Wo setzt die Kritik am Esperanto an? (i.e.  structural comparison of Esperantidos - where does the criticism on Esperanto apply?
Berlin, 2002: Sprachkybernetische Axiomatisierung und Berechnung von Lernerfolg (i.e. linguistic-cybernetic axiomatization and calculation of learning success)
Berlin, 2010: Cliiuy – wie ich eine Sprache erfand (i.e. Cliiuy - how I invented a language)
Berlin, 2013: Sprachschöpfung in der Koniologie, einem neuen Feld der Algebra (i.e. creation of language in coniology, a new field of algebra)

References

External links
 Literary reviews in „La Gazeto“ (Esperanto)
 Review on the novella collection „Ekstremoj“ (Esperanto)

1963 births
Living people
German Esperantists
Volapükologists
German schoolteachers
People from Eschweiler
RWTH Aachen University alumni
Paderborn University alumni